Descendants of the Sun is a 2016 South Korean television series starring Song Joong-ki, Song Hye-kyo, Jin Goo, and Kim Ji-won. It aired on KBS2 from February 24 to April 14, 2016 for 16 episodes. KBS then aired three additional special episodes from April 20 to April 22, 2016 containing highlights and the best scenes from the series, the drama's production process, behind-the-scenes footage, commentaries from cast members and the final epilogue.

The series was a major hit in South Korea where it drew a peak audience share of 38.8%. It received several awards, such as winning the Grand Prize in television at the 52nd Baeksang Arts Awards; and was named the Most Popular Show of the year by Korea Broadcasting Advertising Corporation.

The show was broadcast across Asia where it was hugely popular, and has been credited with a rise in tourism to Korea. Local adaptations have aired in the Philippines and Vietnam, and an adaptation is planned in China. The actors in the show also received international recognition.

Synopsis
Yoo Si-jin (Song Joong-ki) is a captain in the South Korean Army's special forces. He and his friend Master Sergeant Seo Dae-young (Jin Goo) are off-duty when they witness a young man stealing a motorcycle and apprehend him. The thief, Kim Gi-bum (Kim Min-seok), is injured during the chase and therefore sent to the hospital. Dae-young realises his cell phone was stolen by the thief and goes to the hospital with Si-jin to retrieve it.

In the emergency room, Si-jin meets Dr Kang Mo-yeon (Song Hye-kyo) for the first time and is instantly attracted to her. Mo-Yeon mistakenly assumes Si-jin is part of the thief's criminal gang after overhearing Dae-young address him as "Big Boss", which is his call sign. He proves his identity with the help of army surgeon Yoon Myung-Ju (Kim Ji-won) who turns out to be Mo-yeon's former rival from medical school.

Si-jin and Mo-Yeon begin to date, but due to Si-jin often being called in for duty, their dates are often interrupted halfway. Si-jin receives his orders to be deployed on a peacekeeping mission in the fictional war-torn country of Uruk. Meanwhile, Mo-Yeon is upset because she found out that she had been passed over for a professorship favouring a less-capable colleague who had familial connections to the hospital management. When Si-jin returns and meets Mo-Yeon again, she directly asks him to explain his sudden disappearances and job. Still, he cannot go into too much detail due to the highly classified nature of his assignments. They talk about their views on life and realise how different they are. Si-jin, as a soldier, kills to protect lives while Mo-Yeon, as a doctor, honours the Hippocratic Oath and tries to save lives. Due to their philosophical differences, they agree to part ways. Dae-young, on the other hand, faces a dilemma on whether to continue his relationship with Myung-Ju or risk being forced out of the army for breaking fraternisation rules as he was not a commissioned officer. The fact that Myung-ju was the daughter of his and Si-jin's superior, the commander of the Special Forces, made the situation awkward.

Eight months later, Mo-Yeon rebuffs the romantic advances of the hospital director and, as a result, is assigned against her will to lead a team of medical volunteers to Uruk as revenge for her turning down the hospital director. In Uruk, Si-jin and Mo-yeon reunite and both gain a deeper insight into one another's jobs as their respective teams endure an earthquake and a viral epidemic, while also dealing with a South Korean warlord who once fought alongside Si-jin but now takes advantage of the corrupt government of Uruk to make money off human and arms trafficking. While in Uruk, Mo-yeon accidentally confesses her feelings (much to the amusement of their respective teams) and the two officially start dating. She gradually comes to terms with the possibility of him being killed in action and the fact that she may never have full disclosure of his whereabouts. In the meantime, the usually-stoic Dae-young finally works up the nerve to show more affection toward Myung-ju after she nearly dies in quarantine after being infected with the virus.

Si-jin and Mo-yeon continue their relationship after returning to Korea, until Si-jin and Dae-young are sent on a classified operation in which they disappear and are assumed to be dead. Months pass and Mo-yeon mourns Si-jin's death, thus deciding to commemorate his passing by volunteering with a medical team sent to Albania while Myung-ju was sent on a medical mission in Uruk. This is where Si-jin eventually finds her on the day of their one-year death anniversary while Dae-young went to Uruk to find Myung-ju after reporting that they were alive to the Military Headquarters. After their reunion, Si-jin told Mo-yeon that he and Dae-young were rescued from captivity by "a friend from afar", a soldier from North Korea whom Si-jin had helped before. Si-jin and Mo-yeon, along with Myung-ju and Dae-young, are all happily reunited with each other.

Cast

Main 
 Song Joong-ki as Captain Yoo Si-jin (a.k.a. Big Boss)

The Captain and leader of Alpha Team, a fictional elite special forces team of the 707th Special Mission Battalion in South Korea. He followed in the footsteps of his father, a retired Sergeant Major, into the military and graduated from the Korea Military Academy at the top of his class. Si-jin cares little for the politics of war and believes in protecting and defending those who need help, his country and his men's honour, even if it means having to question his superiors' orders. His light-hearted approach to life and witty sense of humour make him popular with his team and subordinates but Mo-yeon quickly realizes that it is his way of deflecting her questions about his job and coping with the pain of losing comrades. At the end of the series, he is promoted to Major. He falls in love with Mo-yeon at first sight but gets rejected by her three times.
 Song Hye-kyo as Doctor Kang Mo-yeon (a.k.a. Beauty and Pretty one)
A cardiothoracic surgeon who works at Haesung Hospital. She is a beautiful, strong, and assertive woman who believes that competence should outweigh connections but must confront the harsh reality that she cannot get anywhere without connections. She stands firmly by her principles and doesn't fall prey easily to her emotions, though she is not afraid to admit her mistakes. Her first meeting with Si-jin begins awkwardly when she mistakes him for a criminal boss and becomes attracted to him. Although the feeling is mutual, she rejects him three times as she finds herself struggling to accept his occupation as a soldier in the special forces and what it entails.
 Jin Goo as Master Sergeant Seo Dae-young (a.k.a. Wolf)

As the most senior non-commissioned officer in Alpha Team and Si-jin's right-hand man and best friend, Dae-young is a career soldier who sticks to his principles and is extremely loyal to his commanding officer, Si-jin and comrades. He is notorious among recruits and Academy cadets as a no-nonsense and strict instructor (he was also Si-jin's former drill instructor at the Academy). His level head and vast experience often come in handy in times of crisis during deployments. He is the straight man to the happy-go-lucky Si-jin and possesses a sharp deadpan sense of humor. For much of the series, he struggles with expressing his true feelings for Myung-ju due to the objection of her father who wanted Si-jin as his son-in-law.
 Kim Ji-won as First Lieutenant Yoon Myung-ju 

An army doctor who is also the daughter of Lieutenant General Yoon, commander of the South Korean Special Forces Brigade. She followed her father's footsteps and graduates from the Korea Military Academy, where she was a junior of Si-jin, before doing an internship at Haesung Hospital. During her first assignment, where she was the medical officer on duty during a training exercise, she first meets Dae-young and is instantly attracted to him. Their relationship is well-known among the other doctors at Haesung Hospital and fellow soldiers but is considered a taboo as she is an officer and he is a non-commissioned officer. However, it does not deter her from pursuing Dae-young, much to the Lt. Gen's chagrin.

Recurring

Alpha Team Members 

 Park Hoon as First Sergeant Choi Woo-geun (a.k.a. Snoopy)

An Explosive ordnance disposal expert who also served as the team's designated marksman and the only married member of Alpha Team
 Choi Woong as Staff Sergeant Gong Cheol-ho (a.k.a. Harry Potter)

 Ahn Bo-hyun as First Sergeant Im Gwang-nam (a.k.a. Piccolo)

Haesung Hospital Medical Services Team 
 Onew as Lee Chi-hoon (1st year resident of Thoracic Surgery a.k.a. Handsome Spaceman)
 Lee Seung-joon as Song Sang-hyun (General Surgeon)
 Seo Jeong-yeon as Ha Ja-ae (ER Senior Nurse) (a.k.a. Miss B)
 Park Hwan-hee as Choi Min-ji (ER Nurse)

People at Haesung Hospital 
 Hyun Jyu-ni as Pyo Ji-soo (Pathology Specialist)
 Tae In-ho as Han Suk-won (Chairman of Haesung Hospital)
 Park Ah-in as Kim Eun-ji (Thoracic Surgery Specialist)
 Jo Woo-ri as Jang Hee-eun (1st Year Resident of Anesthesiology) (wife of Dr. Lee Chi-hoon)

Tae Baek Army 
 Kang Shin-il as Lieutenant General Yoon Gil-joon (a.k.a. Yellow Tiger) (Myung-ju's father)

 Kim Byung-chul as Lieutenant Colonel (later promoted to Colonel) Park Byung-soo

 Kim Min-seok as Private First Class Kim Gi-bum (later promoted to Staff Sergeant as seen in ep 16). A pickpocket later enlisted to the army.

Uruk area 
 Jasper Cho as Daniel Spencer (Peacemaker Emergency Doctor Team)
 Jeon Soo-jin as Ri Ye-hwa (Peacemaker Emergency Nurse Team)
 David Lee McInnis as David Argus (Gang Boss, former Delta Force Captain), the main antagonist.
 Dean Dawson as the Chief of Police (Tae Baek Police Chief)
 Jo Jae-yoon as Jin Young-soo (Chief Manager of Uruk Electric Power Corporation)
 Lee Yi-kyung as Kang Min-jae
 Zyon Barreto as Fatima
 Elena Zhernovaya as Valentine
 David Pipes as Martin (World Times Reporter)
 Ji Seung-hyun as Senior Lieutenant Ahn Jung-joon, Korean People's Army.
 Kwak In-joon as Lee Han-soo (Minister of Foreign Affairs)
 Joey Albright as US Army Delta Force member

Special appearances 
 Lee Kwang-soo as shooting arcade operator (episode 1)
 Lee Jong-hyuk as Captain Kim Jin-seok (episode 2, 5, 10, 15)
 Matthew Douma as Jordan, US Army Delta Force Captain (episode 2, 10, 12)
 Jung Ji-won as TV announcer (episode 2)
 Park Tae-won as TV announcer (episode 2)
 Ryu Hwa-young as Seo Dae-young's ex-girlfriend (episode 4)
 Jun In-taek as Yoo Young-geun (Abraham Yoo) (Yoo Shi Jin's father) (episode 6, 7, 15, 16)
 Park Joon-geum as Lee Chi-hoon's mother (episode 7, 11)
 Anupam Tripathi as injured earthquake survivor and foreign worker who gave Dr Kang Mo-yeon his shoes (episode 6, 7)
 Yoo Ah-in as bank reception Eom Hong-shik (episode 13)
 Nam Gi-ae as Kang Mo-yeon's mother (episode 13)
 Lee Jae-yong as Lieutenant General Choi Ji-ho, Korean People's Army
 Red Velvet as themselves (episode 16)

Production
Descendants of the Sun was fully pre-produced before airing which is a departure from the live-shoot production format that characterizes most Korean dramas. The drama is Song Joong-ki's comeback project after serving his two years of mandatory military service. The production cost 13 billion won (approximately $10.8 million) to produce.

Initially, there were doubts about the profitability of the drama, as a story involving a soldier may not be enough to garner a very high success rate. This is revealed when SBS were reluctant to continue with the project. It was then passed to KBS. According to local reports by Newsis, lead actor Song Joong-ki was not the first choice of writers and directors for the hit South Korean series, as he was deemed too slender for the role of a heroic special forces officer. Song was later cast as the producers decided to change the character of the role. The 6 June episode of tvN's The List 2016 revealed the names of four actors who rejected the role before Song Joong-ki was chosen. As per the show, the A-listers who passed the role includes Won Bin, Jo In-sung, Gong Yoo, and Kim Woo-bin. Reportedly, the actors were skeptical on sporting the army style short hair. It is also said that the artists expressed slight discomfort on portraying a role of a soldier and could not commit with the pre-production format of the show.

On June 12, 2015, lead actors Song Joong-ki and Song Hye-kyo filmed their first scene in Seoul. On September 28, 2015, the entire cast and crew (including the four leads, Song Joong-ki, Song Hye-kyo, Jin Goo, Kim Ji-won, as well as supporting actors Kang Shin-il and Onew) departed for Greece. The team resided in the country for approximately a month to shoot episodes crucial to the drama's plot. According to Greek and South Korean news portals and blogs, filming mainly took place in Zakynthos, Arachova, Lemnos, and Navagio. While the series' location was modelled after Iraq, the decision was made to locate the remote area torn by war at the margin of Balkan Peninsula to avoid diplomatic conflict with the Iraqis.

On November 25, 2015, it was announced that actor Song Joong-ki injured his arm while filming an action scene for the drama on November 23. On December 7, 2015, Song Joong-ki returned to work only 2 weeks after he was injured and spotted filming at a station in Seoul. The MERS-CoV outbreak in South Korea in 2015 also seriously hampered filming schedules. The outbreak claimed the lives of 33 people, according to WHO.

The location which served as the Mowuru Company's base camp was set at the exhausted Taebaek Hanbo Coal Mine while earthquake scenes were mostly filmed at the Samtan Art Mine. Filming also took place at Camp Greaves DMZ Experience Centre, once a US Army base camp during the Korean War. Filming at Haesung Hospital was actually done at the Seoul St Mary's Hospital.

The crew wrapped up the last shoot in the early morning of December 30, 2015. The director's cut, which feature a re-edited version of the last and 16th episode, as well as deleted scenes, a music video and behind-the-scenes footage, was released in the second half of the year.

Due to the success of the drama, an OST concert was held at the Grand Peace Palace at Kyung Hee University in Seoul on May 14, 2016; and featured performers of the drama's soundtrack.

Pre-production
After the success of Descendants of the Sun, the industry saw a shift toward pre-production of Korean dramas. This is because pre-production allowed producers to secure investment and distribution in a carefully planned fashion and allowed the show to air simultaneously in China, thus bringing greater profits. Kim Won-seok, co-writer of Descendants of the Sun, said the system helps raise the quality of the drama. However, apart from Descendants of the Sun, none of the other pre-produced dramas thus far such as Moon Lovers: Scarlet Heart Ryeo, Uncontrollably Fond, and Hwarang: The Poet Warrior Youth have been successful.

Legal
Production company NEW said that there have been hundreds of violations of their publicity rights by businesses, in an attempt to take advantage of the drama's success. The announcement came about when lead actress Song Hye-kyo sued jewelry firm J.Estina for using her pictures for promotion though the contract ended in January. J.Estina said in a press release that it abided by the contract with production staff of Descendants of the Sun, which allowed it to use stills from the episodes as one of the main sponsors of the series. However, NEW refuted the claims, saying that the jewelry firm's arguments lacked legal grounds. Song Hye-kyo eventually won the legal battle and donated the damages received to charity.

Original soundtrack 
The soundtrack of the series topped local music charts. Pre-orders for the soundtrack album surpassed the 10,000 mark, and eventually sold over 60,000 copies.

Reception
Descendants received immense popularity both locally, with a peaking rating of 40% in South Korea, as well as internationally, where it has been sold to 32 countries and translated into 32 different languages. The success of the drama helped strengthen the Hallyu wave, boosting tourism and spreading Korean culture. The series was also watched in North Korea, one of the most secluded countries in the world.

The drama's success factors were attributed to its elaborate screenplay, beautiful love story and the co-production between South Korea and China. The Korea Times said, "At a time when Korean melodramas are said to have been losing steam, 'Descendants of the Sun' brought fantasy together with a number of different genres to create a high quality production." and "the drama appeals to viewers' desires for justice in a society that appears to lack it." Chinese Government mouthpiece People's Daily praised it as "an excellent advertisement for conscription" showcasing South Korea's "national spirit" and "communitarian culture". The drama also earned plaudits from (former) president Park Geun-hye, who praised the drama for instilling "patriotism" among young Koreans. She also called Descendants an exemplary case of the positive effects of cultural content on the manufacturing industry.

Economic effect
In China, iQiyi bought the exclusive rights to stream the show for US$250,000 per episode which, in total, is equivalent to about 40% of the show's production costs. The show was released simultaneously in South Korea and China, the first Korean drama to do so, and was viewed 2.4 billion times by April 2016. The success of the drama was credited for driving up the paid membership of iQiyi. Also the reports have claimed that the drama was sold for US$100,000 per episode in Japan.

The drama's success helped boost Korea's economy; contributing in a rise of tourists, overseas sales of products (exports), and creating new jobs. Descendants has been reported to have earned 3 billion won from product placement advertisements (PPL) and 10 billion won from sales of related sound tracks and video-on-demand service. According to reports, the direct and indirect economic effects of Descendants are estimated to hover above 1 trillion won ($880 million).

The "Two Tone Lip Bar" lipstick that Song Hye-kyo wore in a scene on the show has broken sales records for Aritaum in South Korea with Laneige subsequently hosting its own Descendants of the Sun makeup event on its homepage. The product became so popular that it sold out four days after its release on the popular Chinese shopping website, 11th Street, owned by its Korean parent-company, SK Planet. The same product also experienced "double digit growth" in Singapore.

Laneige, Dal.Komm Coffee, KGC Cheong Kwan Jang Korean Red Ginseng, Subway and Hyundai all reported a surge in sales after exposure of their products in the drama. The popularity of the show has also led to KBS launching several merchandise of the drama, such as cookies, memory sticks, emoticons and commemorative medals, which were specially created and sold to fans.

Cultural impact
Filming locations and sets of the show underwent restoration by the government, due to the demands by both local and foreign tourists. Camp Greaves, the former U.S. military camp near the Demilitarized Zone (DMZ) in Paju, north of Seoul, was turned into a park composed of separate zones focusing on natural scenery, culture and arts, and military experience. The Taebak film site was also re-modeled as a tourist site, where visitors can browse the medical camp and military base wearing costumes with the same design as those worn by the cast.
The set in Taebaek was featured on popular variety shows 2 Days & 1 Night and Battle Trip. Navagio, one of the iconic locations where the "relationship between the lead characters blossom", experienced a surge in popularity among Chinese and Korean tourists.

The success of the drama has given rise to the popularity of "soldier talk", a style of Korean speaking only used in the military. There is also a spike in the number of young men wanting to join South Korean special forces units for their mandatory military service.

Impact outside South Korea
The popularity of the series in China caused concern with the country's Ministry of Public Security, posting a warning on its official Weibo account against the drama warning viewers "watching Korean dramas could be dangerous, and even lead to legal troubles". It was part of a growing concern among Chinese officials at the time who were wary of the growing influence of Korean pop culture on the Chinese populace since the similar success of My Love from the Star which aired in 2014. When Samgyetang (a Korean chicken soup) was featured in the drama, it gained wider appeal among the Chinese.

During its run in Singapore, it was the most-watched show on OTT video streaming provider Viu in the country and enjoyed ratings as high as 31.8%. Statistics from March 2016 showed about 60% of users on Viu had tuned in to watch the drama. In the week following its finale, eight songs from the drama's soundtrack occupied the top 10, including the top six positions, of Singapore's Top 30 Singles chart. The show was also dubbed in Hindi and telecasted on Indian TV Channel, Zindagi and became one of the first K-dramas to be available on a widely known Indian cable network. The popularity of the show drew 8000 tourists from Vietnam, who signed up for tour packages to visit major sightseeing areas and filming locations of Descendants. Prior to the airing of the show, there was a debate on whether it's appropriate for Vietnamese to watch it given the alleged atrocities committed by Korean soldiers against civilians during the Vietnam War.

While prior to the screening of the drama in Thailand, Prayut Chan-o-cha, the prime minister of Thailand, called for citizens of Thailand to watch the drama claiming it conveys messages of "patriotism, sacrifice, obeying orders and being a dutiful citizen". The drama's lead star, Song Joong-ki, was invited to Thailand by Yuthasak Supasorn, governor of the Tourism Authority of Thailand. He visited the country to promote the drama as part of his Asia tour. Song-Song couple also attended a promotional event for the premiere of the drama in Hong Kong. There it recorded over 1.2 million views on ViuTV.

In late 2016, Google Trends revealed that in 2016 most people in Sri Lanka searched for "Descendants of the Sun" rather than "Donald Trump" which stood in stark contrast to most of the world. There the drama is available to stream on Iflix with Sinhalese and English subtitles. The drama also contributed to the rise of tourism in Greece, where scenes of the drama were shot. Additionally it enjoyed popularity in the United States, where the drama was the most-searched on video streaming website Viki. The drama was also broadcast around the world on KBS World with English subtitles; and due to its popularity the drama was put up for streaming worldwide on Netflix.

Criticism

Although the show received a mostly positive critical reception, several critics criticised the allegedly excessive use of product placement in Descendants of the Sun, arguing that it undermined the plot and distracted viewers from key scenes. In response to the criticism, series cinematographer Kim Si-hyoung admitted that the use of product placement was excessive but argued they were an "essential" source of funding as the show's producers found it difficult to secure funding from television advertisements. The show also drew criticism for what was perceived as an unconvincing, predictable plot and unrealistic storyline. Other critics argued that the drama promoted inaccurate perceptions of modern-day South Korean society, such as the existence of a cohesive military culture, and implicitly espoused nationalist and patriarchal values. The show's depiction of women was also criticised for perceived sexist overtones as well. 

A debate in Vietnam over the decision to air the series in the country occurred after a journalist argued that it was inappropriate for Vietnamese audiences to watch a show about the South Korean military given the numerous war crimes it perpetrated during the Vietnam War. Tuổi Trẻ journalist Tran Quang Thi stated in a Facebook post that "During the Vietnam War, Korean troops spread terror in a number of regions in the country, not among the army, but among innocent civilians. Some villages were completely wiped out by Korean troops. I believe if the victims' souls were still around and watched the Korean drama it would break their hearts... No one even thinks about Korean or Chinese TV airing a film that praises Japanese soldiers out of respect for them as victims of World War II."

Awards and nominations

Ratings

Adaptation

Adaptations
A Chinese film adaptation produced by Huace Film & TV and directed by Zhang Yibai is planned. A book based on the script is also planned for release.

A Philippine television adaptation produced by GMA Network was aired from February 10 to December 25, 2020 for 65 episodes.

A Vietnamese television adaptation titled "Hậu duệ mặt trời" was aired on September 2018 for 48 episodes.

References

External links

  
 
 
 

Korean Broadcasting System television dramas
2016 South Korean television series debuts
2016 South Korean television series endings
South Korean military television series
Television shows written by Kim Eun-sook
South Korean romance television series
South Korean pre-produced television series
South Korean television series remade in other languages
Television series by Next Entertainment World
Television series set in fictional countries
Korean-language television shows